Fabricio Jonathan Guevara Cangá (born February 16, 1989) is an Ecuadorian footballer currently playing for Club Deportivo El Nacional.

International career
On November 12, 2008 he was called up to play a friendly match against Mexico. He came on as a substitute on one of the last minutes of the game.

Honours

National team
 Ecuador U-20
 Pan American Games: Gold Medal

External links
http://www.elnacional.ec/index.php?module=Standings&func=displayplayer&cid=19&sid=24&pid=109

1989 births
Living people
People from Quinindé Canton
Association football wingers
Ecuadorian footballers
C.D. El Nacional footballers
L.D.U. Loja footballers
Ecuador international footballers
Pan American Games competitors for Ecuador
Footballers at the 2007 Pan American Games
Medalists at the 2007 Pan American Games
Pan American Games gold medalists for Ecuador
Pan American Games medalists in football
21st-century Ecuadorian people